A quarterback is a position in American and Canadian football.

Quarterback may also refer to:

 "Quarterback" (song), by Kira Isabella, 2014
 Quarterback (TV series), a 2023 streaming television series
 Quarterback (video game), a 1987 American football arcade game
 The Quarterback (1926 film), an American comedy silent film
 The Quarterback (1940 film), an American comedy film
 "The Quarterback" (Glee), a television episode
 Glee: The Quarterback, a 2013 EP by the cast of Glee
 Quarterback, a My Little Pony Earth pony